Big Butte Creek is a  tributary of the Rogue River in the U.S. state of Oregon. Its two forks, the North Fork and the South Fork, both begin high in the Cascade Range near Mount McLoughlin. Flowing predominantly west, they meet near the city of Butte Falls. The main stem flows generally northwest until it empties into the Rogue Falls was incorporated in 1911, and remains the only incorporated town within the watershed's boundaries.

Big Butte Creek's watershed was originally settled over 8,000 years ago by the Klamath, Upper Umpqua, and Takelma tribes of Native Americans. In the Rogue River Wars of the 1850s, most of the Native Americans were either killed or forced onto Indian reservations. The first non-indigenous settlers arrived in the 1860s, naming the creek after Snowy Butte, an early name for Mount McLoughlin. In the late 19th century, the watershed was primarily used for agriculture and logging. The small city of Butte Falls was incorporated in 1911, and remains the only incorporated town within the watershed's boundaries.

Big Butte Springs, located in the watershed, provides clean drinking water to more than 115,000 residents of the Rogue Valley. Water from Big Butte Creek is also diverted for irrigation at several other locations.

The water quality of the Big Butte Creek watershed is generally high, and it supports several species of trout and salmon. The watershed is also home to more than 152 species of birds, 63 species of mammals, 19 species of reptiles, and numerous plants. The Poverty Flats region was designated an Area of Critical Environmental Concern by the Bureau of Land Management in 1995 to protect several rare species of plants.

Course 
Big Butte Creek begins in the Cascade Range near Butte Falls.

The North Fork's headwaters are located on the slopes of the  Rustler Peak. It flows southwest, receiving many small tributaries such as Jackass, Eighty Acre, and Friese creeks. Turning west, it flows just north of Butte Falls before merging with the South Fork.

The South Fork begins at the confluence of two of its tributaries, Twincheria and Rancheria creeks. It flows southwest, receiving Fourbit Creek on the left. Fourbit Creek begins near Mount McLoughlin, where massive faults may allow water to seep into it from nearby Fourmile Lake in the Klamath River watershed. The South Fork turns west and receives Willow Creek on the left. Big Butte Springs are located on Willow Creek, and the Medford Aqueduct, which carries drinking water to cities in the Rogue Valley, parallels the South Fork from there all the way to Butte Falls.

Big Butte Creek travels northwest, gathering McNeil Creek on the left and Clark Creek on the right, along with many other minor tributaries. This region contains many Class II and III rapids, as rated on the International Scale of River Difficulty. The stream is crossed by Cobleigh Road at river mile (RM) 9.5 or river kilometer (RK) 15, and Netherlands Road at RM 3 (RK 4.8). About  before its mouth, Big Butte Creek cascades over Crowfoot Falls and is crossed by Crowfoot Road. It then flows into the Rogue River  from its mouth at the Pacific Ocean. Big Butte Creek's mouth is about one mile southwest of William L. Jess Dam, and Oregon Route 62 passes just north of it.

Discharge 
The United States Geological Survey monitors the flow of Big Butte Creek at three different stream gauges: two on the South Fork, and one on the main stem. Both South Fork gauges were shut down in 1991, but the gauge located near the mouth of Big Butte Creek continues to operate. The main stem often discharges less water than the South Fork alone in the summer months because of numerous diversions.

Watershed 

About 56 percent is federally owned by the Bureau of Land Management and the United States Forest Service, 44 percent is privately owned, and a small fraction belongs to the City of Medford.

The Big Butte Creek watershed experiences a Mediterranean climate. Precipitation averages between  annually. Most precipitation occurs between November and March. Nine percent of the watershed's surface runoff is collected from rain, 35 percent from rain on snow, and 56 percent from snow. The watershed contains the largest groundwater source in the entire Rogue River basin; one major outlet is at Big Butte Springs.

The watershed is split into two geographic regions: the High Cascades and the Western Cascades, both volcanic in origin. The Western Cascades compose the western two thirds of the watershed. This region is highly eroded, being between 17 and 38 million years old. Its unstable slopes are primarily made of pyroclastic rock. Due to the rock's high ability to absorb moisture, earthflows are common. The High Cascades are much younger, around three to seven million years old. Mount McLoughlin is the most prominent High Cascade volcano in the watershed, last erupting between 20,000 and 15,000 years ago. Basalt and andesite are the most common rock types in this region.

Nearby watersheds include Little Butte Creek to the south, small Klamath River tributaries such as Fourmile Creek to the east, the South Fork Rogue River to the east and north, and minor tributaries of the Rogue River including Reese and Indian creeks to the west.

Flora and fauna 

Some of the most common trees that grow in the Big Butte Creek watershed include four species of fir, two species of pine, incense cedar, and western hemlock. The understory contains plants such as Pacific yew, Pacific madrone, chinquapin, and vine maple. Several invasive species have been reported in the Big Butte Creek watershed, such as Kentucky bluegrass, common bent, drooping brome, and redtop. The spread of these species is most likely due to overgrazing. Sensitive species that grow in the watershed include Howell's yampah, Egg Lake monkeyflower, clustered lady's slipper, green-flowered ginger, Mount Mazama collomia, and Detling's microseris. Mallow and popcorn flower have also been discovered in riparian zones. The Poverty Flats Area of Critical Environmental Concern (ACEC) is home to several rare species of plants, including Bellinger's meadowfoam, Howell's yampah, and Rocky Mountain woodsia.

Over 152 species of birds are known or suspected to live in the Big Butte Creek watershed, including the northern goshawk and the northern spotted owl, a vulnerable species. Bald eagles nest around Willow Lake. Amphibians such as the vulnerable Oregon spotted frog and the near threatened Cascades frog inhabit some regions of the watershed. Black-tailed deer, Roosevelt elk, cougars, and black bears are the most common of the 63 species of mammals found in the watershed. Fishers and American martens have also been spotted. The gray wolf and the vulnerable grizzly bear once lived in the watershed, but are now considered extirpated. Nineteen species of reptiles live in the area. Other sensitive species include the wolverine, the western pond turtle, the sandhill crane, and Townsend's big-eared bat.

Rainbow trout, chinook and coho salmon, and Pacific Lamprey are the most common anadromous fish that inhabit Big Butte Creek. They travel as far as Butte Falls, sometimes passing over it during high flows. Because of the cold, sterile conditions of the water and the difficulty of jumping over the Butte Creek waterfall, streams above Butte Falls have very low populations of anadromous fish. Native, resident fish in this area include coastal cutthroat and rainbow trout. Willow Lake contains largemouth bass and rainbow, cutthroat, and brook trout. Overall, the number of fish in the Big Butte Creek watershed has declined in recent years, possibly due to the clearing of riparian zones and rising water temperatures.

History 

Humans have lived in the Big Butte Creek area for at least 8,000 years. The Klamath, Upper Umpqua, Takelma, and Latgawa tribes of Native Americans inhabited the watershed until they were driven out in the Rogue River Wars of the 1850s. On Christmas Eve, December 24, 1855, Captain E. A. Rice along with 34 other men attacked a Native American encampment near the creek's mouth. Eighteen Native American men were killed, all the women and children were captured, and the camp was burned to the ground. Most were relocated to Indian reservations. Non-indigenous settlers first arrived in the early 1860s, and agriculture, ranching, and logging industries quickly developed. Big Butte Creek was named by early settlers for its close proximity to Mount McLoughlin (also known as Snowy Butte), as was nearby Little Butte Creek.

In 1904, a water-powered sawmill was constructed at Butte Falls. The town of Butte Falls was established in 1906, and incorporated in 1911. The Pacific and Eastern Railway was constructed to Butte Falls in 1910. Butte Falls also received water rights to Ginger Springs, providing high quality drinking water for the town.

The Cat Hill Burn destroyed  of forest on Rustler Peak in 1910. The canal begins just below Butte Falls. The Butte Falls Fish Hatchery was also constructed in 1915. Originally, the hatchery impounded water from Ginger Creek, however in 1923 a canal was built transferring  of water from the South Fork of Big Butte Creek. The Medford Aqueduct, a  pipeline, was constructed in 1927. In 1951, a second pipeline was added, and Willow Dam was constructed, creating Willow Lake. The springs serve over 115,000 customers throughout the Rogue Valley.

Loggers felled massive amounts of forest in the 1920s and 1930s. Reforestation efforts began in the 1940s because natural regeneration could not keep pace with the rate of logging. In 1962, the Columbus Day Storm knocked many more large trees to the ground. Today, old-growth forest covers only about five percent of the watershed.

In 1995, the Poverty Flats region was designated an Area of Critical Environmental Concern (ACEC) by the Bureau of Land Management. It was fenced off in 1996 to protect the area from roaming cattle.

The Butte Falls Fish Hatchery was scheduled to be closed by the Oregon Department of Fish and Wildlife in July 2009 as part of a statewide effort to decrease the department's budget, but on July 3 it was announced that the hatchery would continue to operate with only one employee. However, the hatchery was closed permanently in October 2010.

A  portion of the Eagle Point Irrigation Canal failed on October 2, 2011, sending  of muddy water down a hillside, across a road, and into lower Big Butte Creek, a vital salmon spawning area. The canal was repaired by October 28.

Pollution 
The Oregon Department of Environmental Quality (DEQ) has monitored Big Butte Creek for eight different parameters that affect water quality: temperature, oxygen saturation, pH, nutrients, bacteria, chemical contaminants such as pesticides and metals, turbidity, and alkalinity. Streams that exceed the standard level are placed on the DEQ 303d list in accordance with the Clean Water Act. About  of the streams in the Big Butte Creek watershed were listed on the 2004/2006 DEQ 303d list. The entire main stem exceeded the standard level for temperature, oxygen saturation, and E. coli, a type of bacteria. The lower  of the North Fork were listed for high temperature, along with many other minor tributaries. The South Fork was not listed, although some of its tributaries were.

Overall, water quality in the Big Butte Creek watershed is generally high, however road construction and logging can cause severe erosion, leading to high levels of sedimentation and turbidity. The Willow Creek region often experiences high turbidity, but Willow Lake traps the sediment before it can travel downstream. Big Butte Springs provides clean water that requires minimal treatment to meet water quality standards.

Recreation 
Popular recreational activities in the Big Butte Creek watershed include hunting, camping, hiking, and horseback riding. Many tourists also come to sight-see. The most heavily used trail in the area is the Blue Canyon Trail, leading to the Sky Lakes Wilderness, and ultimately the larger Pacific Crest Trail. The city of Butte Falls has organized the Butte Falls Discovery Loop Tour, a half-day-long drive through the Rogue River – Siskiyou National Forest. The loop starts in Butte Falls, and has several stops for hiking and viewing the landscape, including Mount McLoughlin.

Water recreation on Willow Lake includes boating, swimming, fishing, and waterskiing. Fishing is also popular in other streams, especially Fourbit Creek. Cross-country skiing and snowmobiling are popular in the winter.

See also 
 List of rivers of Oregon

Notes and references 
Notes

References

Bibliography 
Books

 
 
 
 

News articles

 
 
 
 
 
 

Websites

 
 
 
 
 
 
 
 

Other

External links 
 

Rivers of Oregon
Rogue River (Oregon)
Rivers of Jackson County, Oregon